M. sinica  may refer to:
 Macaca sinica, the Toque macaque, a reddish-brown coloured Old World monkey species endemic to Sri Lanka
 Manglietia sinica, a plant species endemic to China